SSV-NSMABAAOTWMODAACOTIATW (abbreviated to SSV) was a short-lived musical project formed by the Sisters of Mercy singer Andrew Eldritch in 1997. The band consisted of Andrew Eldritch and the Hamburg-based techno producers Peter Bellendir (formerly of Xmal Deutschland) and T. Schroeder. 

The band served as a vehicle for Eldritch to record a 'spoiler' album, in order to meet his long-standing contractual obligations with WEA. Following the release of the latest Sisters of Mercy studio album, Vision Thing, in 1990, Eldritch had grown tired of the label and had postponed the production of two impending studio albums for several years.

It is "hinted" that the band's full name stands for "Screw Shareholder Value - Not So Much a Band as Another Opportunity to Waste Money on Drugs and Ammunition courtesy of the Idiots at Time Warner".

Peter Bellendir died on February 3, 2013 of severe complications following an organ transplant.

Go Figure
In 1997, SSV recorded their only album, Go Figure, which was given to East West Records but was never officially released. The album has since been bootlegged in various formats and has become infamous.

Eldritch provided some spoken vocals which were used in all tracks on a full-length album, and the percussion section was removed entirely, leaving only the synths and loops of Eldritch's vocals. The resulting album was presented to the record company as a replacement for the two remaining Sisters of Mercy albums. The record company accepted the product, dissolving the contract.

Track listing

All tracks written by Tyler Davis, lyrics by T. Schroeder, vocals by Andrew Eldritch.

"Nice" - 6:16
"Knife Paper Stone and Guns" - 8:11
"Two in the Nose" - 6:03
"Bad Vultee" - 4:58
"Gone" - 6:58
"Drugstar" - 9:31
"High School" - 8:20
"Feel No Pain" - 6:33
"Go Figure" - 11:13
"Shut the Fuck Up" - 6:16

References

External links
 Explanation of SSV at the Sisters of Mercy's website

Techno music groups
Musical groups established in 1997
Musical groups disestablished in 1998
The Sisters of Mercy
East West Records artists